The Ado-Odo/Ota Local Government Area is one of the 19 Local Government Areas of Ogun State, Nigeria.  It came into existence on May 19, 1989, following the merging of Ota, part of the defunct Ifo/Ota Local Government with Ado-Odo/Igbesa Areas of the Yewa South Local Government. Ado-Odo/Ota borders on metropolitan Lagos. The Local Government Area is the second largest in Ogun State and it is headquartered at Ota (or Otta) at to the north of the Area. Other towns and cities include Araromi-Alade, Ado-Odo, Agbara, Igbesa, Iju-Ota, Itele, Kooko Ebiye Town, Owode, Sango Ota etc.

Ado-Odo/Ota is a veritable industrial Local Government it has the largest industrial area and the highest  number of industries in the state,  with this fact, the Local Government generates the highest IGR for Ogun state.

It has an area of 878 km2 and a population of 526,565 at the 2006 census. Being primarily agrarian in nature, the Local Government Area produces cash and food crops especially cocoa, kola nut, palm oil, coffee, cassava, timber, maize, and vegetables. Mineral resources include kaolin, silica sand, gypsum, and glass sand.

The Local Government is populated mainly by the Awori people, a subset of the Yorubas and the original inhabitants of the area. However, other ethnic groups like Egba settlers, Eguns, and Yewas (Egbados) also live here. There are currently eleven Traditional Obaship institutions in the Local Government Area namely: Olofin of Ado-Odo, Olota of Ota, Onilogbo of Ilogbo, Oloja Ekun of Igbesa, Onikooko of Kooko Ebiye, Onitele of Itele, Amiro of Ilamiro, Onitekun of Itekun, Olodan of Odan Abuja Sule, Alagbara of Agbara, Onigun of Odan-Abuja, Onikogbo of Ikogbo, Olu of Owode Ota, Olu of Atan Ota, Olu of Ijoko Ota and Olu of Tigbo Ilu .

The Local Government Area boasts a range of cultural, traditional, and historic attractions. One of the most popular is the Egungun (Masquerade) festival in Ota alongside the Oduduwa (Odu'a) festival in Ado-Odo. There are also shrines such as Ijamido and Ogbodo Shrines. The second oldest storey building in West Africa can be found in Ota, the Vicarage of the St. James Anglican Church built in 1842.

The postal code of the area is 112.

The  Executive Chairman is Com. Hon. Sheriff Adewale Musa.

The Local Government Area is also home to former Nigerian President Olusegun Obasanjo and his post-presidential enterprise, Obasanjo Farms located in Ota.

References

Local Government Areas in Ogun State